Acquah is a Fante surname. Notable people with this surname include:

Afriyie Acquah (born 1992), Ghanaian footballer
Edward Acquah (1935–2011), Ghanaian footballer
George Kingsley Acquah (1942–2007), Ghanaian lawyer and chief justice
Henry Acquah (born 1965), Ghanaian footballer
Milan Acquaah (born 1997), American basketball player
Paul Amoako Acquah, a Ghanaian economist and a former deputy director for the Africa Department of the International Monetary Fund from 1998 to 2001.[1] He is also a former Governor of the Bank of Ghana (2001-2009).
Raymond Acquah (born 1988)  Ghanaian Journalist, Documentarian and Fact-Checker

Surnames of Akan origin